Amanita fuligineodisca is a species of Amanita found in Honduras to Andean Colombia.

References

External links

flavescens
Fungi of South America